Boletus monilifer is a species of porcini-like fungus native to Yunnan Province in Southwestern China, where it grows under trees of the genera Lithocarpus, Quercus and Castanopsis in subtropical montane forests.

References

monilifer
Fungi of China
Fungi described in 2016